The COVID-19 pandemic in Tunisia is part of the ongoing pandemic of coronavirus disease 2019 (COVID-19) caused by severe acute respiratory syndrome coronavirus 2 (SARS-CoV-2). The disease was confirmed to have reached Tunisia on 2 March 2020.

Background 
On 12 January 2020, the World Health Organization (WHO) confirmed that a novel coronavirus was the cause of a respiratory illness in a cluster of people in Wuhan City, Hubei Province, China, which was reported to the WHO on 31 December 2019.

The case fatality ratio for COVID-19 has been much lower than SARS of 2003, but the transmission has been significantly greater, with a significant total death toll. Model-based simulations for Tunisia indicate that the 95% confidence interval for the time-varying reproduction number R t was higher than 1.0 from July to October 2020.

Timeline

March 2020 
 Tunisia confirmed its first case on 2 March 2020, a 40-year-old Tunisian man from Gafsa returning from Italy.
 In addition, 74 suspected cases in Gafsa have been placed under home confinement. Two of the suspected cases violated the confinement measures, and the local health directorate decided to take legal action against them.
 In March there were 394 confirmed cases, 10 deaths and 3 recovered patients. The number of active cases at the end of the month was 381.

April to June 2020 
 There were 600 new cases in April, raising the total number of confirmed cases to 994. The death toll increased to 41. The number of recovered patients grew to 305. There were 648 active cases at the end of the month.
 On 10 May 2020, Tunisia recorded zero new coronavirus cases for the first time since early March.
 During May the number of confirmed cases grew by 83 to 1077. There were seven more fatalities, bringing the death toll to 48. The number of recovered patients rose to 960, leaving 69 active cases at the end of the month.
 In June there were 97 new cases, bringing the total number of confirmed cases to 1174. Two more patients died, raising the death toll to 50. The number of recovered patients grew to 1031, leaving 93 active cases at the end of the month.

July to September 2020 
 On 17 July, the Ministry of Public Health announced that 9 new cases tested positive as of 16 July, including 4 cases of local contamination, raising the total to 1336 confirmed cases.
 By the end of the month, the number of confirmed cases had risen to 1535, an increase by 361 in July. The death toll remained unchanged. The number of recovered patients grew to 1195, leaving 290 active cases by the end of the month.
 There were 2,268 new cases in August, raising the total number of confirmed cases to 3,803. The death toll rose to 77. There were 2,153 active cases at the end of the month.
 There were 13,602 new cases in September, raising the total number of confirmed cases to 17,405. The death toll more than tripled to 246.

October to December 2020 
 There were 42,408 new cases in October, raising the total number of confirmed cases to 59,813. The death toll more than quadrupled to 1,317. There were 53,464 active cases at the end of the month.
 There were 36,956 new cases in November, bringing the total number of confirmed cases to 96,769. The death toll more than doubled to 3,260. The number of recovered patients increased to 70,851, leaving 22,658 active cases at the end of the month.
 Health Minister Faouzi Madhi extended the curfew until January 15 to cover the New Year's holiday and urging people not to hold end-of-year festivities or travel around the country. The country has seen about 50 COVID deaths per day over the last few months. Although Tunisia has not registered any cases of the new virus variant identified in the U.K., the country has suspended all flights with Britain, South Africa, and Australia.
 There were 42,371 new cases in December, raising the total number of confirmed cases to 139,140. The death toll rose to 4,676. The number of recovered patients increased to 105,364, leaving 29,100 active cases at the end of the month.

January to March 2021 
 The government extended its health curfew and banned demonstrations on 23 January. Tunisia reported 103 virus-related deaths on 21 January, the highest figure to date in the country, among the highest rates in Africa. Travel between regions was banned, bars and restaurants were closed except for take-out food, and university classes were transferred online. About 1,000 people have been arrested since the 2021 Tunisian protests began a week ago.
 There were 70,905 new cases in January, raising the total number of confirmed cases to 210,045. The death toll rose to 6,802. The number of recovered patients increased to 162,223, leaving 41,020 active cases at the end of the month.
 There were 23,624 new cases in February, taking the total number of confirmed cases to 233,669. The death toll rose to 8,001. The number of recovered patients increased to 198,398, leaving 27,270 active cases at the end of the month.
 On 2 March, the first cases of lineage B.1.1.7 (the 'UK variant') were reported in Tunisia.
 On 17 March, Tunisia received 93,600 doses of the Pfizer-BioNTech vaccine through COVAX.
 There were 20,349 new cases in March, taking the total number of confirmed cases to 254,018. The death toll rose to 8,812. The number of recovered patients increased to 217,293, leaving 27,913 active cases at the end of the month.

April to June 2021 
 In April 2021, Tunisia extended a curfew from April 9 to April 30 from 7pm to 5 am and banned all public and private gatherings.
 There were 55,101 new cases in April, taking the total number of confirmed cases to 309,119. The death toll rose to 10,722. The number of recovered patients increased to 259,957, leaving 38,440 active cases at the end of the month.
 There were 36,355 new cases in May, taking the total number of confirmed cases to 345,474. The death toll rose to 12,654. The number of recovered patients increased to 303,467, leaving 29,353 active cases at the end of the month.
 There were 74,629 new cases in June, taking the total number of confirmed cases to 420,103. The death toll rose to 14,959. The number of recovered patients increased to 354,441, leaving 50,703 active cases at the end of the month. From 13 March to 29 June, 1,821,431 vaccine doses had been administered and 548,997 persons fully vaccinated.

July to September 2021 
 On 21 July, Tunisian Prime Minister Hichem Mechichi fired Faouzi Mehdi as its health minister and appointed Mohamed Trabelsi as caretaker health minister amid a collapse of the healthcare system due to the increase of COVID-19 cases. There were 175,429 new cases in July, taking the total number of confirmed cases to 595,532. The death toll rose to 20,067. The number of recovered patients increased to 516,831, leaving 58,634 active cases at the end of the month.
 On 6 August, Romania announced that it will begin to deliver for free 1.3 million COVID-19 vaccines to four countries to help tackle the pandemic. The donation to Tunisia consists of 425,000 doses.
 There were 68,502 new cases in August, taking the total number of confirmed cases to 664,034. The death toll rose to 23,451. The number of recovered patients increased to 612,150, leaving 26,433 active cases at the end of the month.
 There were 43,156 new cases in September, taking the total number of confirmed cases to 707,190. The death toll rose to 24,890. The number of recovered patients increased to 675,942, leaving 6,358 active cases at the end of the month. 3.8 million persons had been fully vaccinated.

October to December 2021 
 There were 5,586 new cases in October, bringing the total number of confirmed cases to 712,776. The death toll rose to 25,244. The number of recovered patients increased to 686,181, leaving 1,351 active cases at the end of the month.
 There were 4,934 new cases in November, bringing the total number of confirmed cases to 717,710. The death toll rose to 25,376. The number of recovered patients increased to 691,184, leaving 1,150 active cases at the end of the month.
 Tunisia's first case of the Omicron variant was reported on 3 December.
 There were 10,133 new cases in December, bringing the total number of confirmed cases to 727,843. The death toll rose to 25,576. The number of recovered patients increased to 696,486, leaving 5,781 active cases at the end of the month.

January to March 2022 
 On 2 January 2022, one death and five hundred and forty two new cases were reported. There were 179,396 new cases in January, raising the total number of confirmed cases to 907,239. The death toll rose to 26,271. The number of recovered patients increased to 766,677, leaving 114,291 active cases at the end of the month.
 There were 90,991 new cases in February, raising the total number of confirmed cases to 998,230. The death toll rose to 27,784. The number of recovered patients increased to 950,873, leaving 19,573 active cases at the end of the month.
 There were 39,128 new cases in March, raising the total number of confirmed cases to 1,037,358. The death toll rose to 28,425. The number of recovered patients increased to 1,022,000, leaving no active cases at the end of the month.

April to June 2022 
 There were 3,354 new cases in April, bringing the total number of confirmed cases to 1,040,712. The death toll rose to 28,566. The number of recovered patients increased to 1,026,756.
 There were 2,160 new cases in May, bringing the total number of confirmed cases to 1,042,872. The death toll rose to 28,641. The number of recovered patients increased to 1,028,885.
 There were 23,255 new cases in June, bringing the total number of confirmed cases to 1,066,127. The death toll rose to 28,748. The number of recovered patients increased to 1,037,537.

July to September 2022 
 There were 68,533 new cases in July, bringing the total number of confirmed cases to 1,134,660. The death toll rose to 29,105. The number of recovered patients increased to 1,114,359.
 There were 9,802 new cases in August, bringing the total number of confirmed cases to 1,143,862. The death toll rose to 29,234.
 There were 1,824 new cases in September, bringing the total number of confirmed cases to 1,145,686. The death toll rose to 29,246. The number of recovered patients increased to 1,132,266.

October to December 2022 
 There were 907 new cases in October, bringing the total number of confirmed cases to 1,146,593. The death toll rose to 29,259. The number of recovered patients increased to 1,133,072.
 There were 479 new cases in November, bringing the total number of confirmed cases to 1,147,072. The death toll rose to 29,268.
 There were 573 new cases in December, bringing the total number of confirmed cases to 1,147,645. The death toll rose to 29,285. The number of recovered patients increased to 1,134,465.

January to March 2023 
 There were 2,711 new cases in January, bringing the total number of confirmed cases to 1,150,356. The death toll rose to 29,308. The number of recovered patients increased to 1,134,769.

Economic consequences 
On 18 March 2020, the President of the Tunis Stock Exchange (BVMT) noted a 14.2% drop in the stock market index in Tunisia.
On 21 March 2020, the flagship index of the Tunis Stock Exchange finished falling by 7.3% to 6,138.82 points.

Statistics

Charts

Total no. of cases (cumulative)

Confirmed new cases per day

Confirmed deaths per day

Cases identified by Governorates of Tunisia

See also 
 COVID-19 pandemic in Africa
 COVID-19 pandemic by country and territory

References

External links 
 Official website 
 

 
Coronavirus pandemic
Coronavirus pandemic 
Coronavirus pandemic
Coronavirus pandemic
Tunisia
Tunisia
Disease outbreaks in Tunisia